The Casket Lottery is an American indie rock band from Kansas City, Missouri signed to Second Nature Recordings and Big Scary Monsters.

History

1997
The band started in 1997 after Nathan Ellis spent time on the road with Coalesce. He and Stacy Hilt struck up an instant friendship and love for music beyond the hardcore and metal roots of Coalesce. After leaving Coalesce in the fall of 1997, Ellis assumed bass duties, filling the hole left by Stacy's departure. A chance meeting at a local benefit show reunited Nathan and Stacy once again, at which time he presented Stacy with the basement tracks that would end up on the Diver cassette and Dot, Dot. They found a perfect complement to their musical background in a then 15-year-old drumming phenom Nathan (Jr.) Richardson. The band has toured across the United States numerous times (with Reflector, Small Brown Bike, Rocky Votolato, Proudentall, and Limbeck among others), and has released a healthy number of records.

2006–present
In mid-2006, the band went on hiatus. Singer Nathan Ellis works on a record and plays shows with his new bands Jackie Carol and Able Baker Fox, and drummer Nathan "Junior" Richardson joined Appleseed Cast, completing several tours as well as recording on their album "Peregrine." He has subsequently quit The Appleseed Cast. Both Nathans are members of the reformed Coalesce.

In 2010 the band re-united as special guest at Coalesce show in their hometown. They also reformed in early 2011 to play shows with recently re-united friends in Small Brown Bike. In late August 2011 they announced via their Facebook page that they were to enter the studio with Ed Rose to record a new album.

On August 30, 2011, The Casket Lottery announced that they were recording new material with Ed Rose at Black Lodge, which was followed by an announcement on January 9, 2012, that the new material will be released via No Sleep Records in the Spring and Summer of 2012.

In 2017 Run for Cover Records approached the band about re-releasing their first three LP's on vinyl. Nathan Ellis and Stacy Hilt were instantly interested, but Nathan Richardson was busy pursuing a career in the medical field. Ellis and Hilt with Richardson's blessing approached longtime friend Jason Trabue (Hopesfall) to fill the seat left by Richardson's departure. The band practiced throughout 2017 to prepare for their first US tours since 2004.

In January 2020 the band started recording their 5th full length album at B-24 Studios in Kansas City, MO with Producer Ed Rose and Engineer Josh Barber. The album is scheduled to be released in late summer / early fall of 2020.

Members 
Nathan Ellis (guitar, vocals)
Stacy Hilt (bass, vocals)
Jason Trabue (drums)
 Terrence Vitali (guitar, vocals)

Past members 
 Nathan Richardson
 Brent Windler
 Nick Siegel

Discography

EPs and split records 
The Diver: Cassette Demo – 1998
Dot Dot Dash Something or Other Dot EP – 1999 on Status Records
The Casket Lottery/Reflector Split – 1999 on Undecided Records
The Casket Lottery/Waxwing Split – 2000 on Second Nature Recordings
Lost at Sea 7" – 2000 on Status Records
Blessed/Cursed EP – 2000 on Second Nature Recordings
The Casket Lottery/Small Brown Bike Split – 2002 on Second Nature Recordings
The Casket Lottery/Hot Water Music Split – 2002 on Second Nature Recordings
Smoke and Mirrors EP – 2003 on Second Nature Recordings
The Door 7" – 2012 on No Sleep Records
Touché Amoré / The Casket Lottery – 2012 on No Sleep Records

Full albums 
Choose Bronze – 1999 on Second Nature Recordings
Moving Mountains – 2000 on Second Nature Recordings
Survival Is For Cowards – 2002 on Second Nature Recordings
Real Fear – 2012 on No Sleep Records
Short Songs For End times - 2020 on Wiretap Records, Second Nature Recordings and Big Scary Monsters (EU/UK)

Compilations 
Possiblies and Maybes – 2003 on Second Nature Recordings

External links
The Casket Lottery Facebook
Second Nature Recordings
Nathan Ellis' new project, Jackie Carol
Nathan "Junior" Richardson's new band, The Appleseed Cast

Indie rock musical groups from Missouri
Musical groups from Kansas City, Missouri
Undecided Records artists
No Sleep Records artists